Lars Molin may refer to:

 Lars Molin (filmmaker) (1942–1999), Swedish filmmaker
 Lars Molin (ice hockey) (born 1956), Swedish ice hockey player